Dartford is a town in Kent, South East England.

Dartford may also refer to:

Dartford (UK Parliament constituency)
Dartford, Washington, an unincorporated community
Dartford Borough Council, an administrative authority in North West Kent, England
Borough of Dartford, a district of Kent, England
A village in Green Lake, Wisconsin
A community in Trent Hills, Ontario